The New Zealand cricket team are scheduled to tour Bangladesh in September 2023 to play three One Day International (ODI) matches. The International Cricket Council (ICC) finalized the bilateral series in a press release. The matches will be used as preparation ahead of the 2023 Cricket World Cup.

References

2023 in Bangladeshi cricket
2023 in New Zealand cricket
International cricket competitions in 2023–24
New Zealand cricket tours of Bangladesh